Kenneth Houdret (born 9 August 1993) is a Belgian footballer who is currently playing for Dender EH in the Belgian First Amateur Division.

Houdret is a left-footed midfielder who made his debut during the 2011/12 season in the Belgian Second Division for Charleroi.

External links

1994 births
Living people
Sportspeople from Charleroi
Footballers from Hainaut (province)
Belgian footballers
R. Charleroi S.C. players
Oud-Heverlee Leuven players
Royale Union Saint-Gilloise players
U.S. Avellino 1912 players
F.C.V. Dender E.H. players
Expatriate footballers in Italy
Belgian expatriate footballers
Belgian Pro League players
Challenger Pro League players
Association football midfielders
Serie B players